Petra Mohn (11 March 1911 – 15 June 1996) was a Norwegian politician for the Conservative Party.

She served as a deputy representative to the Norwegian Parliament from Østfold during the terms 1961–1965.

References

1911 births
1996 deaths
Deputy members of the Storting
Conservative Party (Norway) politicians
Østfold politicians